Les Enfoirés ('The Tossers' or 'The Bastards') is the name given to the singers and performers in the yearly charity concert for the Restaurants du Cœur. Founded in 1986, its first concert was held in 1989.

Participating artists and personalities

Discography

Albums

Live

Compilations

Singles and charting songs
(Selective, charting singles)

*Did not appear in the official Belgian Ultratop 50 charts, but rather in the bubbling under Ultratip charts.

External links
Les Enfoirés official website  and Les Enfoirés official web site 
Official site of Les restos du cœur

References

French music industry